The Yam-Alin is a mountain range in Amur Oblast and Khabarovsk Krai, Russian Far East.

The range is part of the Ezop/Yam-Alin volcanic zone.

History
The range is located in a remote area and was unexplored until mid 19th century. Between 1849 and 1853, a large Russian military expedition led by Nikolai Khristoforovich Akhte operated in the Russian Far East. The German surveyor of the Russian service Ludwig Schwarz was assigned to it as an astronomer. Together with topographers Stepan Vasilievich Krutiv and Alexei Argunov, as well as geologist Nikolay Gavrilovich Meglitsky, the Yam-Alin range area was studied and topographically surveyed in detail. Based on their measurements, the first reliable map of Yam-Alin was drawn in 1851.

Geography
The Yam-Alin and the Dusse-Alin to the south of it are northern prolongations of the Bureya Range. To the southwest of the range rises the Ezop Range. In the north it connects with the southern end of the Taikan Range and to the northwest the Selemdzha Range stretches westwards.

Hydrography
The range forms the watershed between the rivers of the Selemdzha and Amgun basins. Some of the right tributaries of the Selemzha, such as the Takh-Urak, Kumusun and Selitkan, have their sources in the western slopes of the range. On the eastern there are the sources of a few left tributaries of the Amgun, such as the Kerby and Nimelen, as well as the Assyni (Ассыни), a tributary of the Tugur and the Munikan, a tributary of the Konin —a tributary of the Tugur.

Flora 

See also
List of mountains and hills of Russia

References

External links
Vegetation cover of the axial part of the Yam-Alin Mountain range (Far East, Amur-Uda interfluve). Types of phytocoenoses (in Russian)

Mountain ranges of Amur Oblast
Mountain ranges of Khabarovsk Krai
ceb:Khrebet Yam-Alin'
ru:Ям-Алинь